Mulberry is a census-designated place (CDP) in Miami Township, Clermont County, Ohio, United States. The population was 3,323 at the 2010 census.

History
Mulberry was known as "Newberry" when it was laid out in 1818.  The post office closed in 1971.

Geography
Mulberry is located in northwestern Clermont County at  (39.193980, -84.250915), near the center of Miami Township. It is bordered to the east by Mount Repose. Ohio State Route 28 passes through the southeast corner of the CDP, and Interstate 275 forms the western edge, with access to Mulberry where it crosses State Route 28 at Exit 57.

Demographics

As of the census of 2000, there were 3,139 people, 1,196 households, and 800 families residing in the CDP. The population density was 2,072.7 people per square mile (802.6/km2). There were 1,229 housing units at an average density of 811.5/sq mi (314.3/km2). The racial makeup of the CDP was 97.26% White, 0.92% African American, 0.29% Native American, 0.73% Asian, 0.03% Pacific Islander, 0.19% from other races, and 0.57% from two or more races. Hispanic or Latino of any race were 0.73% of the population.

There were 1,196 households, out of which 31.2% had children under the age of 18 living with them, 53.3% were married couples living together, 10.6% had a female householder with no husband present, and 33.1% were non-families. 28.1% of all households were made up of individuals, and 8.5% had someone living alone who was 65 years of age or older. The average household size was 2.34 and the average family size was 2.87.

In the CDP the population was spread out, with 20.5% under the age of 18, 8.8% from 18 to 24, 25.1% from 25 to 44, 25.1% from 45 to 64, and 20.5% who were 65 years of age or older. The median age was 42 years. For every 100 females there were 78.1 males. For every 100 females age 18 and over, there were 73.9 males.

The median income for a household in the CDP was $50,326, and the median income for a family was $64,044. Males had a median income of $42,264 versus $28,686 for females. The per capita income for the CDP was $26,623. None of the families and 4.2% of the population were living below the poverty line, including no under eighteens and 11.8% of those over 64.

References

Census-designated places in Clermont County, Ohio